The Fujinon XF 56mm F1.2 R is an interchangeable camera lens announced by Fujifilm on January 6, 2014. As of 2015, it is one of the widest-aperture native mirrorless lenses.

APD variant
In September 2014, Fujifilm announced a variant of this lens, the Fujinon XF 56mm F1.2 R APD, which has an additional APD filter element for apodisation, with the goal of improving the appearance of out-of-focus areas, or bokeh, when the lens is used wide open. This design principle is based on an optical technology originally invented (and patented) by Minolta in the 1980s and implemented in the Minolta/Sony series of Smooth Trans Focus lenses since 1999. As a side effect, light transmission is reduced at the widest apertures, making 1.2 effectively t/1.7, having progressively less light reduction until 5.6, beyond which the APD lens has the same light gathering as the standard model without the internal filter. The APD lens also cannot take advantage of phase detection autofocus on cameras with this function, relying instead on slower contrast detection autofocus.

Notes

References
http://www.dpreview.com/products/fujifilm/lenses/fujifilm_xf_56mm/specifications

 https://www.dpreview.com/products/fujifilm/lenses/fujifilm_xf_56mm_apd/overview

56
Camera lenses introduced in 2014